The year 1621 in science and technology involved some significant events.

Astronomy
 Johann Schreck (1576–1630), also known as Johannes Schreck, Terrenz or Terrentius, introduces the telescope to China.

Botany
 The University of Oxford Botanic Garden, the oldest botanical garden in Great Britain, is founded as a physic garden by Henry Danvers, 1st Earl of Danby.

Medicine
 Robert Burton publishes his treatise The Anatomy of Melancholy.

Physics
 Willebrord Snellius formulates Snell's law on refraction.

Technology
 A simple microscope is developed.
 Cornelius Vermuyden begins reclamation of Canvey Island in England.

Births
 January 27 – Thomas Willis, English physician who contributes to knowledge of the nervous and cardiovascular systems (died 1675)

Deaths
 July 2 – Thomas Harriot, English ethnographer, astronomer and mathematician (born c. 1560)
 September 1 – Bahāʾ al-dīn al-ʿĀmilī, Arab philosopher and astronomer (born 1547)
 Jan Jesenius, Slovak physician (born 1566)

References

 
17th century in science
1620s in science